Antony Easthope (14 April 193914 December 1999) was a scholar, writer, and literary controversialist, who spent most of his career at Manchester Metropolitan University. He taught also at the Brown University, University of Warwick, Wolfson College, Oxford, the University of Adelaide, and the University of Virginia. In addition to scholarly and popular books on literary theory, film theory, Marxism, and psychoanalysis, Easthope was known for his letters to newspapers, particularly The Guardian, often attacking prominent literary figures.

Major works
Poetry as Discourse. London: Methuen, 1983.
British Post-Structuralism. London: Routledge, 1988.
Poetry and Phantasy. Cambridge: Cambridge University Press, 1989.
What a Man's Gotta Do: The Masculine Myth in Popular Culture. Boston: Unwin Hyman, 1990.
Literary Into Cultural Studies. London: Routledge, 1991.
Paradigm Lost and Paradigm Regained. London: Routledge, 1993.
Wordsworth Now and Then: Romanticism and Contemporary Culture. Buckingham: Open University Press, 1993.
The Impact of Radical Theory on Britain in the 1970s. London: Routledge, 1994.
Donald Davie and the Failure of Englishness. Albany: SUNY Press, 1996.
Derrida and British Film Theory. St. Martin's, 1996.
But What Is Cultural Studies? London: Routledge, 1997.
Cinecities in the Sixties. London: Routledge, 1997.
Classic Film Theory and Semiotics. Oxford: Oxford University Press, 1998.
The Pleasures of Labour: Marxist Aesthetics in a Post-Marxist World. Edinburgh: University of Edinburgh Press, 1999.
Englishness and National Culture. London: Routledge, 1999.
Paradise Lost: Ideology, Phantasy and Contradiction. New York: St. Martin's, 1999.
Postmodernism and Critical and Cultural Theory. New York: Routledge, 1999.
The Unconscious. London: Routledge, 1999.
Freud's Spectres. Manchester: Manchester University Press, 2000.

References

20th-century British writers
British literary critics
1939 births
1999 deaths